Vidrga (in older sources also Viderga) is a small settlement in the Municipality of Zagorje ob Savi in central Slovenia. It lies north of Vače on the main road from Moravče to Izlake. The area is part of the traditional region of Upper Carniola. It is now included with the rest of the municipality in the Central Sava Statistical Region.

Name
The name Vidrga is believed to be derived from a pre-Slavic hydronym etymologically related to Idrija with a prothetic -v.

History
Vidrga was a hamlet of Kandrše until 1998, when it was separated from it and made a separate village.

References

External links
Vidrga on Geopedia

Populated places in the Municipality of Zagorje ob Savi